John Pediasimos (ca. 1250 – early 14th century; in Gr., 'pediasimos'/πεδιάσιμος means 'inhabitant of a valley'), also known as John Pothos, was a Byzantine churchman, scholar, astronomer, mathematician, mythologist, syllogistic, musician, and physician active at Constantinople, Ohrid and Thessalonica.

John was born about 1250, and for the first few years of his life studied in Constantinople under the teachers Manuel Holobolos and George Akropolites. Gregory of Cyprus was a fellow pupil. After his studies he was a given the prestigious position of hypatos ton philosophon. He later served as chartophylax in the Archbishopric of Ohrid (ca. 1280), where he also taught. If his identification with a certain megas sakellarios John Pothos is correct, by 1284 he was in Thessalonica. John wrote on many subjects on his fields of study.

Sources
 

13th-century births
14th-century deaths
13th-century Byzantine physicians
Byzantine astronomers
13th-century Byzantine writers

13th-century Greek physicians
14th-century Greek physicians
13th-century Greek educators
14th-century Greek educators
13th-century Greek musicians
14th-century Greek musicians
13th-century Greek mathematicians
14th-century Greek mathematicians
13th-century Greek astronomers
14th-century Greek astronomers